Olrish Saurel (born 13 September 1985) is a Haitian footballer who is last known to have played as a defender for Dire Dawa. Besides Haiti, he has played in Thailand and Ethiopia.

Career

Club career

Saurel started his career with Haitian side Don Bosco (Pétion-Ville). After that, he signed for Chainat Hornbill in Thailand. After that, he returned to Don Bosco (Pétion-Ville).

In 2013, Saurel signed for Antiguan club Antigua Barracuda. After that, he signed for Sidama Coffee in Ethiopia.

International career

He is a former Haiti international. He scored as Haiti came back from 2-0 down to draw 2-2 with Italy which was seen as a schock result.

References

External links

 
 Olrish Saurel at playmakertstats.com

Haitian expatriate sportspeople in Thailand
Expatriate footballers in Ethiopia
Ligue Haïtienne players
Haitian expatriate footballers
Association football defenders
1985 births
Ethiopian Premier League players
Dire Dawa City S.C. players
Olrish Saurel
Olrish Saurel
Antigua Barracuda F.C. players
Expatriate footballers in Thailand
Haitian footballers
Living people
Haiti international footballers
Don Bosco FC players
People from Cap-Haïtien